Markus Bollmann (born 6 January 1981) is a German former footballer.

Career
In the 2000–01 season, Bollmann was transferred from SpVgg Beckum to SC Paderborn 07. With his club, he was promoted to the 2. Bundesliga. Later in the summer of 2006, he joined Arminia Bielefeld. After a period of settling in, he was regularly capped in the second half of the 2006–07 season, with the result that in May 2009 his contract was prolonged to 2012.

Private life
Bollmann is married to his wife Kristina. In 2008, their common son was born. His brother Maik Bollmann (*1991) plays for the Hammer SpVg in the Oberliga Westfalen.

References

External links
 

1981 births
Living people
German footballers
People from Warendorf (district)
Sportspeople from Münster (region)
Footballers from North Rhine-Westphalia
Association football defenders
Hammer SpVg players
SC Paderborn 07 players
Arminia Bielefeld players
Arminia Bielefeld II players
MSV Duisburg players
MSV Duisburg II players
SC Wiedenbrück 2000 players
Bundesliga players
2. Bundesliga players
3. Liga players
Regionalliga players